Kentucky Route 468 (KY 468) is a  state highway in Pike County, Kentucky, that runs from KY 3220 at Sidney to KY 292 northwest of Nolan, West Virginia, near the Kentucky-West Virginia state line. It runs parallel to Big Creek for its entire length and is thus known as North Big Creek Road for its entire length.

Major intersections

References

0468
Transportation in Pike County, Kentucky